Bratislav Mijalković (born 10 September 1971) is a Serbian former footballer who played as a defender.

Club career
After starting out at his hometown club Radnički Pirot, Mijalković was transferred to Partizan in 1990. He spent six seasons with the Crno-beli, winning three national championships (1993, 1994, and 1996) and two national cups (1992 and 1994).

In May 1996, Mijalković moved abroad to France and signed a contract with Rennes. He, however, failed to make an impact and was soon released by the French club. In February 1997, Mijalković joined Italian side Perugia. He spent one and a half seasons in Italy. In March 2000, Mijalković was signed by Bulgarian club Spartak Varna.

International career
At international level, Mijalković made three appearances for the Yugoslavia under-21s in 1991.

Honours
Partizan
 First League of FR Yugoslavia: 1992–93, 1993–94, 1995–96
 FR Yugoslavia Cup: 1991–92, 1993–94

References

External links
 
 

1971 births
Living people
People from Pirot
Yugoslav footballers
Serbia and Montenegro footballers
Serbian footballers
Association football defenders
Yugoslavia under-21 international footballers
FK Radnički Pirot players
FK Partizan players
Stade Rennais F.C. players
A.C. Perugia Calcio players
PFC Spartak Varna players
FK Vlasina players
Yugoslav First League players
First League of Serbia and Montenegro players
Serie A players
Serie B players
Second League of Serbia and Montenegro players
Serbia and Montenegro expatriate footballers
Expatriate footballers in France
Expatriate footballers in Italy
Expatriate footballers in Bulgaria
Serbia and Montenegro expatriate sportspeople in France
Serbia and Montenegro expatriate sportspeople in Italy
Serbia and Montenegro expatriate sportspeople in Bulgaria